Oleg Sushkov is a professor at the University of New South Wales and a leader in the field of high temperature super-conductors. Educated in Russia in quantum mechanics and nuclear physics, he now teaches in Australia.

Education
 1974 MSc, Novosibirsk State University, Russia 
 1978 PhD in Physics, Budker Institute of Nuclear Physics, Novosibirsk, Russia
 1984 Doctor of Science (Habilitation), Budker Institute of Nuclear Physics, Novosibirsk, Russia

Awards and recognition
 Australian Research Council Professorial Fellow, 2011 - 2015, University of New South Wales 
 Alexander von Humbold Research Award (Germany), 2006
 Lenin Komsomol State Prize in Science (Soviet Union), 1982

Selected publications 

, Google Scholar estimates that Sushkov's h-index is 53.

References

External links
 Google Scholar list for Oleg Sushkov

Year of birth missing (living people)
Living people
Russian physicists
Russian nuclear physicists
Australian physicists
Australian nuclear physicists
Australian people of Russian descent